ShakeDeal is an Asia-based B2B e-commerce and supply chain company involved in procuring and supplying Safety items, MRO (manufacture, repair, and operating supplies), office supplies, packaging supplies, and corporate gifts. The company is headquartered in Bangalore, India and has 6 fulfillment centers across major cities like Bangalore, Delhi NCR, and Ahmedabad. ShakeDeal is operated by Bangalore-based Opcommerce Online Pvt Ltd.

History

ShakeDeal was founded in February 2016 by brothers Akshay Hegde and Akash Hegde and their friend Santhosh Reddy. Few months after launch, the company expanded its portfolio to cover over 15 categories and over 250 brands.  In 2018, it was acquired by Cincinnati based Private Equity firm Vora Ventures for an undisclosed sum.

In 2019, the company launched its own procure to pay solution for large enterprises. The same year, it also expanded its footprint to Delhi NCR and Ahmedabad. By June 2019, ShakeDeal introduced its private label products to plug gaps in the industrials segment.

In August 2019, it added rewards and recognition to its corporate gifting vertical and in November, launched its own packaging services vertical.

In March 2020, following the nation-wide lockdown triggered by the COVID-19 pandemic, the company expanded its health and safety portfolio to include COVID essential products.

The company has tied up with over 200 organizations including Adani, Vedanta, Saudi Aramco, Tata Consumer Products, Nayara Energy, Bharat Heavy Electricals Limited, Shell and Flipkart.

Funding
ShakeDeal was initially bootstrapped by the founders since its inception in February 2016. It subsequently raised funding from angel investors in July 2017.

In March 2018, it was acquired by US based  private equity firm  Vora Ventures for an undisclosed amount. Vora Ventures has led the Series A institutional round of funding into ShakeDeal.

Awards and recognition
2017: Technology Hot100 Startups.

2020: Fastest growing Small Business of the Year at the Small Business Awards 2020 organised by Zee News, Economic Times, Entrepreneur India.

2020: E-commerce (B2B) Start-up of the Year at the 10th Edition of the Entrepreneur Awards 2020.

See also

 List of largest Internet companies
 B2B e-commerce
 E-commerce in India

References

External links
Shakedeal in News

Indian companies established in 2016
Internet properties established in 2016